Carry On Henry is a 1971 British historical comedy film, the 21st release in the series of 31 Carry On films (1958–1992). It tells a fictionalised story involving Sid James as Henry VIII, who chases after Barbara Windsor's character Bettina. James and Windsor feature alongside other regulars Kenneth Williams, Charles Hawtrey, Joan Sims, Terry Scott and Kenneth Connor. This was the first time that Williams and Connor appeared together since Carry On Cleo seven years previously. The original alternative title was to be Anne of a Thousand Lays, a pun on the Richard Burton film Anne of the Thousand Days, and Sid James wears exactly the same cloak that Burton wore in that film. Harry Secombe was considered for Henry VIII when it appeared that Sid James may not be available due to possible stage commitments. James was making a lengthy appearance in South Africa which was cut down when he heard he was wanted for the film and arrived back in time for the second day of shooting.

The opening theme is a version of "Greensleeves", as arranged by Eric Rogers.

Casting and characterisation
Sid James plays Henry VIII as a lovable rogue who is surrounded by scheming courtiers. Peter Rogers originally planned on using Harry Secombe in the title role, and in the first draft of the screenplay Henry was going to be an avid composer of madrigals, but the idea was shelved and Sid James took over the role. Two comedic madrigals written for the film but unused were later performed in the 1972 Carry On Christmas special and the 1973 stage show Carry On London.

Plot
The film opens with a passage, which states:

This film is based on a recently discovered manuscript by one William Cobbler, which reveals that Henry VIII did in fact have two more wives. Although it was first thought that Cromwell originated the story, it is now known to be definitely all Cobbler's... from beginning to end.

Henry VIII (Sid James) has his wife (Patsy Rowlands) beheaded and quickly marries Marie of Normandy (Joan Sims). This union was organised at the behest of bumbling Cardinal Wolsey (Terry Scott) as Marie is cousin of King Francis I of France. Henry's wedding night ardour dies when he finds she reeks of garlic, but she refuses to stop eating it. Marie gets frustrated so soon receives amorous advances from Sir Roger de Lodgerley (Charles Hawtrey who, while still in his camp persona, is playing against type as a ladies' man).

Henry is keen to be rid of Marie, as he has met the lovely Bettina (Barbara Windsor, in her favourite Carry On role). Bettina is the daughter of the Earl of Bristol (Peter Butterworth, in a one scene cameo), a punning reference to Bristols. Thomas Cromwell (Kenneth Williams) assists in ousting Marie by organising Lord Hampton of Wick (Kenneth Connor) to kidnap the King in a staged plot. Cromwell and Lord Hampton also secretly plot to bring the king to harm as part of this escapade, but the false kidnapping fails.

Henry seizes on Marie's infidelity with de Lodgerley to be free of her; all he needs is a confession from de Lodgerley. He orders Cromwell to extract a confession using any means necessary. This leads to a running joke in the torture chamber as Henry keeps changing his mind about the confession due to political necessities, requiring multiple changes and retractions of the original confession. Wolsey is baffled by all the intrigue, and Cromwell is driven to treason by all of Henry's unreasonable demands.

Cast

Sid James as King Henry VIII
Kenneth Williams as Thomas Cromwell
Charles Hawtrey as Sir Roger de Lodgerley
Joan Sims as Queen Marie of Normandy
Terry Scott as Cardinal Wolsey
Barbara Windsor as Bettina
Kenneth Connor as Lord Hampton of Wick
Julian Holloway as Sir Thomas
Peter Gilmore as Francis, King of France
Peter Butterworth as Charles, Earl of Bristol
Julian Orchard as Duc de Poncenay
Gertan Klauber as Bidet
David Davenport as Major-domo
Margaret Nolan as Buxom lass
William Mervyn as Physician
Norman Chappell as 1st plotter
Derek Francis as Farmer
Bill Maynard as Fawkes
Douglas Ridley as 2nd plotter
Leon Greene as Torturer
David Prowse as Torturer
Monica Dietrich as Katherine Howard
Billy Cornelius as Guard
Marjie Lawrence as Serving maid
Patsy Rowlands as Queen
Alan Curtis as Conte di Pisa
John Bluthal as Royal tailor (uncredited)
Bill McGuirk as Flunkey (uncredited)
Jane Cardew as Henry's 2nd wife (uncredited)
Valerie Shute as Maid (uncredited)
Peter Rigby as Henry's courtier (uncredited)
Trevor Roberts as Henry's courtier (uncredited)
Peter Munt as Henry's courtier (uncredited)

Filming and locations
Filming dates – 12 October-27 November 1970

Interiors:
 Pinewood Studios, Buckinghamshire

Exteriors:
 Windsor Great Park, Berkshire
 The Long Walk, Windsor Castle, Berkshire
 Knebworth House, Hertfordshire

See also
Cultural depictions of Henry VIII of England

References

Bibliography

Keeping the British End Up: Four Decades of Saucy Cinema by Simon Sheridan (third edition) (2007) (Reynolds & Hearn Books)

External links

Carry On Henry Location Guide at The Whippit Inn

1971 films
1970s sex comedy films
1970s historical comedy films
Henry
British historical comedy films
1970s English-language films
Films set in Tudor England
Films directed by Gerald Thomas
British parody films
British sex comedy films
Films about Henry VIII
Films shot at Pinewood Studios
Films produced by Peter Rogers
Films with screenplays by Talbot Rothwell
Cultural depictions of Henry VIII
Cultural depictions of Francis I of France
Cultural depictions of Guy Fawkes
1971 comedy films
1970s British films